Lansingerland-Zoetermeer railway station is a railway station on the borders of Bleiswijk and Zoetermeer, Netherlands. It was previously known under its conceptual name BleiZo. The train services are operated by Nederlandse Spoorwegen.

History
The opening had been planned for 2014, but this was delayed until 2018 and the first train stopped at the station at 9 December 2018. RandstadRail extension opened at 19 May 2019.

The station lies on the Den Haag – Gouda line and is located between Zoetermeer Oost and Gouda railway stations. RandstadRail line 4 from The Hague De Uithof terminates over here.

References

External link 

 Website of the station (in Dutch)

Railway stations in South Holland